Last of the Pagans is a 1935 MGM film based on the Herman Melville novel Typee (1846).

The film was shot on location in Tahiti.

Plot summary

Taro is a native of the island of Tofua who kidnaps a wife named Lilleo from the neighboring island while bride hunting. At first she greatly dislikes him but comes to love him. During a feast, an American schooner arrives at the island and offers liquor and trinkets such as pocket watches to the natives if they sign a form they can not read which forces them to work in terrible conditions in the phosphate mine on the island of Patua for the Olympic Mining Company. Taro is sent to the mines and Lilleo is taken back to Tafoa to marry the chieftain. During a mine collapse, Taro risks his life to save his supervisor which greatly impresses his captors. They agree to bring him Lilleo, but they change their mind when they learn she is the chieftain's bride. Disheartened, Lilleo sneaks aboard the schooner to Patua without their permission. They find out and lock her in a cabin but she escapes to meet Taro. They bring her back to the schooner and Taro follows suit but is imprisoned by the French authorities in a dilapidated prison. During a hurricane the roof of the prison flies off and Taro escapes to the schooner, which has been abandoned by all except Lilleo. He saves her and after the storm clears they sail for an uninhabited island to start a new life together.

Cast
 Ray Mala as Taro
 Lotus Long as Lilleo
 Rudolph Anders as Superintendent's Assistant
 Chester Gan as Chinese Cook (uncredited)
 Rangapo A. Taipoo as Taro's Mother (uncredited)
 Teio A. Tematua as The Chief (uncredited)
 Charles Trowbridge as Mine Superintendent

References

External links
 Last of the Pagans at IMDb
 Last of the Pagans at TCMDB
 
 
  Last of the Pagans movie file at Archive.org

Films based on works by Herman Melville
Metro-Goldwyn-Mayer films
1935 films
Films based on American novels
American black-and-white films
American adventure drama films
1930s adventure drama films
1935 romantic drama films
American romantic drama films
Films shot in Tahiti
Films directed by Richard Thorpe
Public domain
1930s American films